The Yamaha V9938 is a video display processor (VDP) used on the MSX2 home computer, as well as on the Geneve 9640 enhanced TI-99/4A clone and the Tatung Einstein 256. It was also used in a few MSX1 computers, in a configuration with 16kB VRAM.

The Yamaha V9938, also known as MSX-Video or VDP (Video Display Processor), is the successor of the Texas Instruments TMS9918 used in the MSX1 and other systems. The V9938 was in turn succeeded by the Yamaha V9958.

Specifications
 Video RAM: 16–192 KB
 Text modes: 80 × 24, 40 × 24 and 32 × 24
 Resolution: 512 × 212 (16 colors from 512), 256 × 212 (16 colors from 512) and 256 × 212 (256 colors)
 Sprites: 32, 16 colors, max 8 per horizontal line
 Hardware acceleration for copy, line, fill and logical operations available
 Interlacing to double vertical resolution
 Vertical scroll register

Detailed specifications
 Video RAM: 4 possible configurations
 16 KB (modes G4 up to G7 will not be available)
 64 KB (modes G6 and G7 will not be available)
 128 KB: most common configuration
 192 KB, where 64 KB is extended-VRAM (only available as back-buffer for G4 and G5 modes)
 Clock: 21 MHz
 Video output frequency: 15 kHz
 Sprites: 32, 16 colors (1 per line. 3, 7 or 15 colors/line by using the CC attribute), max 8 per horizontal line
 Hardware acceleration, with copy, line, fill etc. With or without logical operations.
 Vertical scroll register
 Capable of superimposition and digitization
 Support for connecting a lightpen and a mouse
 Resolution:
 Horizontal: 256 or 512
 Vertical: 192p, 212p, 384i or 424i
 Color modes:
 Paletted RGB: 16 colors out of 512
 Fixed RGB: 256 colors
 Screen modes
 Text modes:
 T1: 40 × 24 with 2 colors (out of 512)
 T2: 80 × 24 with 4 colors (out of 512)
 All text modes can have 26.5 rows as well.
 Pattern modes
 G1: 256 × 192 with 16 paletted colors and 1 table of 8×8 patterns
 G2: 256 × 192 with 16 paletted colors and 3 tables of 8×8 patterns
 G3: 256 × 192 with 16 paletted colors and 3 tables of 8×8 patterns
 MC: 64 × 48 with 16 paletted colors and 8×2 patterns
 All modes with 192 lines can have 212 lines as well (similarly 48 → 53 in MC)
 Bitmap modes:
 G4: 256 × 212 with 16 paletted colors
 G5: 512 × 212 with 4 paletted colors
 G6: 512 × 212 with 16 paletted colors
 G7: 256 × 212 with 256 fixed-colors
 All modes with 212 lines can have 192 lines as well (similarly 48 → 53 in MC)
 All vertical resolutions can be doubled by interlacing

MSX-specific terminology
On MSX, the screen modes are often referred to by their assigned number in MSX-Basic. This mapping is as follows:

See also
Texas Instruments TMS9918 
Yamaha V9958

External links
MSX-Video Technical Data Book, for Yamaha V9938 (August 1985)  bitsavers.org

V9938 programmer guide
http://rs.gr8bit.ru/Documentation/V9938-programmers-guide.pdf

Graphics chips
MSX